Benedictus, Latin for "blessed" or "a blessed person", may refer to:

Music
 "Benedictus" (canticle), also called the "Canticle of Zachary", a canticle in the Gospel of Lukas
 Part of the "Sanctus", a hymn and part of the eucharistic prayer in Western Christianity
 Various musical interpretations of it
 "Benedictus" a song by Simon & Garfunkel from their 1964 album Wednesday Morning, 3 A.M.
 "Benedictus" (Strawbs song), a song by Strawbs on their 1972 album Grave New World

People
 Benedictus (given name)
 David Benedictus (born 1938), English novelist and theatre director
 Kyle Benedictus (born 1991), Scottish footballer
  (1879–1930), French chemist who invented laminated glass

See also
 Benedictus Deus (disambiguation), one of several  papal bulls issued by a Pope
 Benedict (disambiguation)
 Benedicta
 Benedicto